Car-free walking is a movement in the United Kingdom that aims to encourage people who take recreational walks to use public transport instead of a car to get to their starting point.

Principles 

Car-free walking was created to encourage walkers to use public transport rather than using cars to reach the start of a walk. This is to reduce the number of cars in the countryside, particularly in National Parks, which can cause congestion and inappropriate parking. It is also to support bus and train services in rural areas. Encouraging people not to use their cars is also one of the key aspects of efforts to combat climate change caused through greenhouse gas emissions.

Benefits 

Car-free walking has environmental benefits, because it encourages people not to use a car and provides information on how to do this. It also supports public transport in rural areas. The benefits for the walker include the opportunity to walk linear routes that start and finish in different places and the chance to have a drink at the end of the walk without then having to drive. Many of the walking routes suggest a pub at the end of the walk.

Supporters 

Many organisations encourage their members to use public transport when walking. Prominent supporters of this approach include:
 Youth Hostel Association (YHA), through their Empty Roads website
 Ramblers Association

Websites

National websites 

Car Free Walks is an internet-based project to collect car-free walking routes from around the UK. People can find car-free walks throughout the UK or add their own walks. Car Free Walks is part of the growing car-free movement around the world. It has won a number of environmentally themed awards.

The website was created in September 2007 by a group of keen walkers based in Brighton, UK, and features walks in England, Scotland and Wales as well as a news and blog section. Walks on the site can be accessed free of charge, including GPX-downloads (which requires registration) and printer-friendly versions of each walk. Site visitors can get up-to-date information about public transport to and from the walk as the website links to the Transport Direct website. Site visitors can submit their own walks via a walk editor and participate in a quarterly prize draw.

Regional websites

There are many websites describing walks in a particular region or from a particular railway line. These include:
 East Suffolk Line Walks
 Rail Rambles (Wales)
 Car free walks from Richmond (Yorkshire)
 Car free Walks in the Thames Valley and Chilterns

Books 
There are several books of car-free walking routes.
 Car Free Cumbria: Walking the County Using Lake Steamers, Local Buses and Trains, A John Gilham green guide, by Jon Sparks, John Gillham, Ronald Turnbull
 Walks in the Country Near London, Globetrotter Walking Guides, by Christopher Somerville
 55 555 walks, Yan Press, by Robert Swain - routes accessible by the 555 bus route from Lancaster to Kendal

See also 
 15 minute city
 Carfree city
 Greenway (landscape)
 Pedestrian zone
 Walkability
 Walking audit

References

Sources
 Tourism issues - Too much traffic
 Empty Roads

External links 
 Car Free Walks
 East Suffolk Line Walks
 Rail Rambles 
 Car free walks from Richmond, Yorkshire
 Car free Walks in the Thames Valley and Chilterns
 old-classic-cars

Car-free movement
Walking in the United Kingdom